Ibrahim Adaham Abdul Cader, known as I. A. Cader (5 January 1917 – 14 September 1979) was a Sri Lankan lawyer and member of the Parliament of Sri Lanka.

Biography  
Ibrahim Adaham Abdul Cader was born in Thalapitiya, Southern Province, Sri Lanka on 5 January 1917 and received his primary school education Mahinda College in Galle before attending St. Peter's College, Colombo. He then entered the Ceylon Law College, passing out as a Proctor. Cader went on to be a lawyer and a gem merchant. He was also elected as the President of the All Ceylon Moors Association.

Cader was a member of the Sri Lanka Freedom Party and in July 1960 was successful in gaining a seat representing the Beruwala Electoral District at the fifth parliamentary election defeating his UNP rival, Abdul Bakeer Markar by 2,771 votes. Between 12 February 1964 and 17 December 1964 he held the position of Deputy Chairman of Committees.

At the sixth parliamentary elections held in March 1965, Cader ran again but was unsuccessful in retaining his seat, losing by just over 1,700 votes to Abdul Bakeer Markar. On 23 October 1969 he was appointed as a Senator by the Governor-General, William Gopallawa. He ran again for the seat of Beruwala in May 1970 this time defeating Markar by almost 4,000 votes. On the 22 May 1970 he was appointed as Deputy Speaker and Chairman of Committees, a position that he held until 18 May 1977.

Cader did not contest the 1977 parliamentary elections and was subsequently assigned as the country's ambassador to Egypt.

References

1917 births
1979 deaths
Ambassadors of Sri Lanka to Egypt
Alumni of Ceylon Law College
Alumni of Mahinda College
Alumni of St. Peter's College, Colombo
Deputy chairmen of committees of the Parliament of Sri Lanka
Deputy speakers and chairmen of committees of the Parliament of Sri Lanka
Members of the 5th Parliament of Ceylon
Members of the 7th Parliament of Ceylon
Members of the Senate of Ceylon
People from Galle
Sri Lanka Freedom Party politicians
Sri Lankan Moor lawyers
Sri Lankan Moor politicians
Sri Lankan Muslims